Ulster Township is one of twelve townships in Floyd County, Iowa, USA.  As of the 2000 census, its population was 373.

Geography
According to the United States Census Bureau, Ulster Township covers an area of 41.51 square miles (107.51 square kilometers).

Unincorporated towns
 Carney at 
 Roseville at 
(This list is based on USGS data and may include former settlements.)

Adjacent townships
 Rudd Township (north)
 Floyd Township (northeast)
 Saint Charles Township (east)
 Union Township (south)
 Scott Township (southwest)
 Rockford Township (west)

Cemeteries
Ulster Township contains Ulsterville Cemetery

Major highways
  Iowa Highway 14
  Iowa Highway 147

School districts
 Charles City Community School District
 Rudd-Rockford-Marble Rock Community School District

Political districts
 Iowa's 4th congressional district
 State House District 14
 State Senate District 7

References
 United States Census Bureau 2008 TIGER/Line Shapefiles
 United States Board on Geographic Names (GNIS)
 United States National Atlas

External links
 US-Counties.com
 City-Data.com

Townships in Floyd County, Iowa
Townships in Iowa